Seated Girl in Peasant Costume is an oil on panel painting by Dutch artist Gerard ter Borch, created c. 1650. It is held in the Rijksmuseum, in Amsterdam.

Description
The painting depicts a girl dressed in peasants' clothing. She can be recognized as an unmarried farmer's daughter by her braids and red hairband. She is seated in a dark room, holding a printed piece of paper in her right hand, while she appears to be thinking with a nostalgic look. She may have been reading a love letter, which would explain her thoughtful face. Ter Borch probably chose his half-sister, Gesina ter Borch, as a model for this genre piece. She was a model for many of his paintings.

Provenance
The work came from the private collection of Isaac de Bruyn and Johanna Geertruida van der Leeuw. This couple bequeathed the work to the Rijksmuseum in 1961.

References

1650 paintings
Paintings by Gerard ter Borch
Paintings in the collection of the Rijksmuseum
Genre paintings